Bianca Reddy (born 21 December 1982) is a former Australian netball player who played for the Adelaide Thunderbirds. In 2010, Reddy did not play in the ANZ Championship, but played for the West Coast Fever replacing the injured Josie Janz.

Biography
Her brothers are Perth Glory goalkeeper Liam Reddy, former Parramatta Eels, Wests Tigers, and South Sydney Rabbitohs Rugby League back Joel Reddy, and is the daughter of Australian Rugby League international and St George Dragons forward Rod Reddy.

Reddy previously worked at Blackwood High School as a netball teacher for the special interest netball program. Currently, she is a science teacher at Mitcham Girls High School.

References
2008 Adelaide Thunderbirds profile. Retrieved on 2008-05-22.

1982 births
Australian netball players
Living people
Adelaide Thunderbirds players
West Coast Fever players
ANZ Championship players
Netball players from New South Wales
Australian netball coaches
Australian schoolteachers
Bianca
Australian sportspeople of Indian descent
AIS Canberra Darters players
Contax Netball Club players
South Australia state netball league players